P-valve may refer to:

 Proportioning valve
 P-valve (diving)